The Copa Andalucía is played with the ACB teams of Andalusia and sometimes Andalusian LEB teams. It is organized by the Andalusian Basketball Federation since 1997.

Finals

Source:

Titles

Editions with more than one round

2001
Cajasur Córdoba joined the competition as the Andalusian representative in the LEB league.

2002
CB Los Barrios joined the semifinals as champion of the II Copa Andalucía LEB.

2003
Algeciras Cepsa and CB Ciudad de Huelva, LEB 2 and LEB team respectively, joined the semifinals with the two ACB teams.

2004
Algeciras Cepsa repeated in the semifinals as champion of the Copa Andalucía played by teams from LEB league.

2005
CB Ciudad de Huelva joined the semifinals as champion of the Copa Andalucía played by teams from LEB league.

2006
In this edition of the Cup, CB Villa de Los Barrios joined the semifinals as champion of the Copa Andalucía played by teams from LEB league.

Source:

2018
Unicaja, the only ACB team, qualified directly for the final against the winner of the two LEB Oro teams.

References

External links
Andalusian Basketball Federation

An
Sport in Andalusia